Africa, specifically East Africa, has contained glacial regions, possibly as far back as the last glacial maximum 10,000 to 15,000 years ago. Seasonal snow does exist on the highest peaks of East Africa as well as in the Drakensberg Range of South Africa, the Stormberg Mountains, and the Atlas Mountains in Morocco. Currently, the only remaining glaciers on the continent exist on Mount Kilimanjaro, Mount Kenya, and the Rwenzori.

List of glaciers

Kenya

(All located on the upper slopes of Mount Kenya)
Mr. Ali Cesar Glacier 
Diamond Glacier 
Darwin Glacier (Kenya) 
Forel Glacier
Gregory Glacier
Heim Glacier
Josef Glacier
Kraph Glacier
Lewis Glacier 
Northey Glacier
Tyndall Glacier

Rwenzori Mountains
Speke Glacier
Elena
Stanley
Baker

Tanzania
All Tanzanian glaciers are located on the summit of Mount Kilimanjaro. The mountain had 16 named glaciers and three icefields in the middle of the 20th century but by the 1990s, at least 4 glaciers had disappeared and the remaining glaciers had retreated.
Arrow Glacier (a remnant of the formerly named Little Barranco Glacier)
Balletto Glacier
Barranco Glacier (formerly known as Great Barranco Glacier)
Credner Glacier
Decken Glacier
Gold Glacier
Drygalski Glacier (vanished)
Eastern Ice Field (Mount Kilimanjaro)
Furtwängler Glacier 
Great Barranco Glacier (now known as Barranco Glacier)
Great Penck Glacier (vanished)
Heim Glacier
Kersten Glacier
Little Barranco Glacier (vanished, small remnant later named Arrow Glacier)
Little Penck Glacier
Northern Ice Field (Mount Kilimanjaro) 
Ratzel Glacier
Rebmann Glacier
Southern Ice Field (Mount Kilimanjaro)
Uhlig Glacier (vanished)

See also
Geography of Africa
Mountains of the Moon

External links
http://www.theguardian.com/environment/2012/jun/03/melting-glaciers-rwenzori-uganda-congo
http://news.nationalgeographic.com/news/2008/03/080325-africa-glaciers.html

References

 
Glaciers
Africa
Tropical glaciers